Perovec is a small settlement in the Municipality of Slovenske Konjice in eastern Slovenia. It lies north of Draža Vas, just east of the Slovenian A1 motorway. The area is part of the traditional region of Styria. The municipality is now included in the Savinja Statistical Region.

References

External links
Perovec at Geopedia

Populated places in the Municipality of Slovenske Konjice